Castleconnell (historically Caisleán Uí Chonaing) is a village in County Limerick on the banks of the River Shannon.

History

The ruins of the 'Castle of Connell' (in fact the castle of a family named Gunning), from which the name of the village derives, was built on a rock outcrop overlooking the bend of the river. It was destroyed in a siege by the army of General Ginkel, fighting in support of the Army of William of Orange at the end of the 17th century. Even today a large chunk of the castle wall lies some fifty feet from the castle, thrown clear across the road by siege cannons. A footbridge over the Shannon - built during the 1939-1945 Emergency by the Irish Army under Captain Carley Owens - connects counties Limerick and Clare. The nearby Mountshannon House is a testament to John FitzGibbon, 1st Earl of Clare, who in the late 18th century was the Attorney-General for Ireland and subsequent Lord Chancellor of Ireland. FitzGibbon was a Protestant hardliner and helped usher in the Acts of Union 1800, which resulted in the Irish parliament's abolition. The house where he and his descendants lived was burnt to the ground by the IRA in the 1920s.

Many fine nineteenth-century buildings overlook the Shannon in Castleconnell. One of these, the former schoolhouse, was for many years home to the Irish Harp Centre. Another, the former convent, is now the Castleoaks House Hotel. A little south of the village lies the ruins of the once-grand Mountshannon house, a Palladian mansion gutted by fire early in the 20th century.

Fishing
Known for its fishing - both coarse and sport - it has a history as a fishing destination stretching back into the 19th century. Main catch was salmon and trout. The local pub Shannon Inn became well known for its fishing clientele that stayed there over the years.

The Shannon Electricity Scheme and its Ardnacrusha dam at Parteen changed the fortunes of the village considerably in the 1930s when it reduced the flow of water south of the dam to approximately one sixth, dropping water levels along the Shannon.

The engineers added a fish lift to the dam, allowing fish to be lifted in a water-filled container and thereby pass upstream to their traditional spawning beds. The river at Castleconnell is also known for its rich bird life, and particularly its swans, many of which are migratory Icelandic whooper swans wintering and breeding on the river.

Sport

Gaelic games
Castleconnell is the home of Limerick's most successful hurling club. The Ahane GAA club won 19 Limerick Senior Hurling Championships between 1931 and 1948 and provided many of the Limerick team that won All-Ireland Senior Hurling Championships in 1934, 1936 and 1940. Among its most famous players were Mick Mackey and Jackie Power.

Boxing
Boxer Andy Lee was raised in Castleconnell from the age of 14. On 13 December 2014 he became current World WBO Middleweight champion.

Rowing
Castleconnell boat club has been in existence since 1983. It is located at World's End (also known as Worral's End). Castleconnell has one of the best stretches of water to row on in Ireland. Rowers have a smooth, wide water to row on for 3.2 kilometers till O' Briens bridge. Just beyond the bridge, the rower's have another 1.5 kilometers before they come to a water flow regulator.

Transport
Castleconnell railway station opened on 8 August 1858. the station lies on the Limerick–Ballybrophy railway line.

Politics
The town was previously under the jurisdiction of Limerick County Council. Due to its proximity to Limerick City and with the growth of the city itself, Castleconnell became part of the Limerick City Metropolitan District, located within the Limerick City East Municipal District local authority area of Limerick City and County Council.

Notable residents

 John Enright (1865-1908) world flycasting champion 1896-1906
Bulmer Hobson (died 1968)
Andy Lee
Pat Shortt
Marcus Horan
Paul Warwick
John Gilhooly
Sarah Lavin
Tom Morrissey
Dan Morrissey

See also
 List of towns and villages in Ireland

References

External links

Towns and villages in County Limerick
Parishes of the Roman Catholic Diocese of Killaloe
Populated places on the River Shannon